UFC Live: Cruz vs. Johnson (also known as UFC on Versus 6) was a mixed martial arts event held by the Ultimate Fighting Championship on October 1, 2011 at the Verizon Center in Washington, D.C.

Background
This event featured a UFC Bantamweight Championship bout between champion Dominick Cruz and #1 contender Demetrious Johnson, which was the first UFC title fight to be aired live at a free televised UFC event since UFC 75 in September 2007.

Fabio Maldonado was expected to face Aaron Rosa in a Light Heavyweight bout, but was pulled from the card due to an injury. A replacement was being sought but this fight was scrapped.

Jeff Hougland was expected to face Mike Easton in a Bantamweight bout, but has been injured and replaced by UFC newcomer Byron Bloodworth. Bloodworth failed to make the 135 pound weight limit, thus the match was changed to a Catchweight bout, with Bloodworth being fined for the infraction.

With Fox taking over UFC broadcasting rights in 2012, this was the last UFC and Zuffa event to be aired on Versus.

Results

Bonus awards
Fighters were awarded $65,000 bonuses.

 Fight of the Night: Matt Wiman vs. Mac Danzig
 Knockout of the Night: Anthony Johnson
 Submission of the Night: Stefan Struve

See also
List of UFC events

References

External links

UFC on Versus
2011 in mixed martial arts
Mixed martial arts in Washington, D.C.
Sports competitions in Washington, D.C.
2011 in sports in Washington, D.C.
Events in Washington, D.C.